The Wulfing cache, or Malden plates, are eight Mississippian copper plates crafted by peoples of the Mississippian culture. They were discovered in Dunklin County, Missouri in 1906 by Ray Grooms, a farmer, while plowing a field south of Malden.  The repousséd copper plates were instrumental to archaeologists' developing the concept known as the Southeastern Ceremonial Complex.

History

The eight plates are made in the Late Braden style associated with the Cahokia site in western Illinois, the major center of Mississippian culture. They are thought to date to the late 13th or early 14th century. The remains of copper workshops discovered near Mound 34 at Cahokia are so far the only copper workshops found at a Mississippian culture archaeological site. The Wulfing plates depict raptors and bird-human hybrids, with heads ranging from human heads to raptor's heads to double-headed raptors on stylized bird's bodies, with naturalistic bird's claws. The plates were found buried in a field with no known local platform mounds or village sites. They had been considerably used prior to their burial, as each plate shows multiple episodes of aboriginal repair work, including patch repairs and riveted cracks.

Groomes found the plates while plowing his field a little deeper than normal. When he noticed something reflective glittering in the freshly plowed furrow, he found a few pieces of copper. On further inspection, he found the plates buried at a 45° angle with their tail ends up. The plates were stacked together, and Groomes later stated that there did not seem to be much dirt worked in between them. Groomes sold the plates and within a year they had been acquired by John Max Wulfing, for whom they are now named. Wulfing later gave the plates to Washington University in St. Louis.  It in turn loaned them to the Saint Louis Art Museum, where they have been on display for many years.

Individual plates

The eight plates are designated Plates A–H. Except for Plate B, which has two heads, all of the figures face to the right. All of the plates are missing the majority of their tail sections due to being struck by Groomes' plow. Some of the plates show more expertise in artistic design and some of the plates show more proficiency in the production of the basic copper plates. These qualities do not correlate, as some of the more artistically refined designs are on inferior copper plates and some of the better plates have less sophisticated designs. This suggests that the production of the plates and the embossing of the designs was divided between a trained coppersmith, who turned the raw nuggets of copper into plates, and an artistic specialist who did the repoussé work. This division of labor in craftwork is unusual in aboriginal peoples.

Plate A
The human head has the Forked Eye Surround motif, Beaded Forelock, ear-spool, Hand Over Mouth motif, and occipital hair knot associated with the "Birdman" of the Mississippian Art and Ceremonial Complex (M.A.C.C.). Among Mississippian copper plates, the naturalistic depiction of the human head of Plate A most closely matches the treatment of the human figures of the Etowah Rogan plates. It also has an elaborate headdress with what may be feathers and a smaller agnathous human face with a forked eye surround motif, ear spools, and a distinctive crenelated crown-like device. This face is similar to an artifact found in a burial in Fulton County, Illinois known as the Emmons mask, a copper covered cedar head with galena painted forked eye motifs and the distinctive crenelated device. This wooden head is thought to be an actual headdress piece worn similarly to how it is portrayed on plate A, and even has holes for attaching it to a headdress in this position.

Plate B
Plate B is the only two-headed avian of the group, with the heads joined at the neck and looking in opposite directions, one to the right and the other to the left. Plate B is the only one of the Wulfing cache to have three centrally located ventral spots and two semi-circular spots on either side of the abdomen.

Plate C
Plate C is the only one of the plates to have a wavy line emanating from the Forked Eye Surround Motif.

Plate D
Plate D is the only one of the plates to have only one centrally located ventral spot. This may not have been the case when it was originally produced, as a repaired break in the center of the plate seems to have been fixed by omitting the middle section of the plate.

Plate E

Plate F
It has two punched holes located vertically on the left side of the plate, possibly used for attaching it to another surface or a headdress.

Plate G
This plate was patched more times than any of the other plates.

Plate H
Plate H is the most fragmentary of the group and is in two pieces.

Malden style plates
Many similar plates found in other states are now believed to have come from the same workshop, if not the same artist, as the Wulfing cache. The sites of the discovery of these other plates span the midwestern US. They include the Upper Bluff Lake falcon plate from southern Illinois, the Edwards plate from northern Illinois, the Toul Creek plate from Arkansas, the Reed Mound plate from Oklahoma and the Wilcox plate from west central Florida. They have been grouped together as the "Malden style" for Mississippian copper repoussé avians. Archaeologists speculate that the missing tails of the Malden plates probably looked like the tail of the Upper Bluff Lake plate, whose lower half is mostly intact. The plates also show stylistic links to plates found in burials at Etowah Mounds in Georgia (Etowah plates) and Spiro Mounds in Oklahoma.

See also
 Old Copper Complex
 Mississippian culture pottery
 Mississippian stone statuary
 Visual arts by indigenous peoples of the Americas

References
Notes

Bibliography

External links
 Mississippian Falcon art

Mississippian culture
American Indian relics
Copper sculptures
Native American sculpture
1906 archaeological discoveries
Dunklin County, Missouri